Armaan Malik is an Indian singer and songwriter. He made his debut in Bollywood by singing the song "Bum Bum Bhole" from Taare Zameen Par in 2007. He has sung in Hindi, Telugu, English, Kannada, Bengali, Marathi, Tamil, Gujarati, Urdu
and Malayalam
. This is a list of songs recorded by Armaan Malik.

Hindi film songs

Hindi non-film songs

Telugu film songs

Tamil film songs

Kannada film songs

Bengali film songs

Malayalam film songs

Marathi film songs

Gujarati film songs

Pakistani film songs

Albums

EPs

Singles

As lead artist

As featured artist

See also
 List of songs recorded by Arijit Singh
 List of songs recorded by Shreya Ghoshal
 List of songs recorded by Jubin Nautiyal
 List of Indian playback singers

References 

Lists of songs recorded by Indian singers